Bothrocophias colombianus, commonly known as the Colombian toad-headed pitviper, is a species of venomous snake in the  family Viperidae. It is endemic to South America.

Geographic range
It is found in western Colombia in the departments of Antioquia and Cauca.

Description
In coloration and pattern Bothrocophias colombianus closely resembles its North American "cousin" Agkistrodon contortrix mokasen, commonly known as the northern copperhead.

References

Further reading
 Rendahl, H., and G. Vestergren. Notes on Colombian Snakes. Arkiv för Zoologi 33 (5): 1–16. (Bothrops microphthalmus colombianus, p. 15.)

colombianus
Snakes of South America
Reptiles of Colombia
Endemic fauna of Colombia
Reptiles described in 1940